Des Moines Township is an inactive township in Clark County, in the U.S. state of Missouri.

Des Moines Township was named after the Des Moines River.

References

Townships in Missouri
Townships in Clark County, Missouri